Just Another Margin is a 2014 Chinese spoof-comedy film written and directed by Jeffrey Lau, and starring Betty Sun, Ronald Cheng, Ekin Cheng and Alex Fong. It was released on 2 February 2014.

Cast
 Betty Sun as Jin-ling
 Kenny Lin as Leopard
 Ronald Cheng as Shi Wen-Sheng
 Ekin Cheng as Mao Song
 Alex Fong as Tranzor
 Ivy Chen as
 Yu Qian as Butler Feng
 Huang Yi as Snow
 Guo Degang as Mrs. Zhao
 Ada Choi as Widow
 Julian Cheung as
 Patrick Tang as Shakespeare
 Hu Ge as Black Emperor's messenger
 Lam Suet as Mao Dai-Long
 Vonnie Lei as Madam Mei
 Tats Lau as Brother Yi
 Ma Jing as Monk
 Li Yong-Chung as Madam Sun
 Fang Hao-Min as Yu-Feng
 Shi Wu as Chun-Mei
 Shao Yin as Ah Jiao
 Zhong Guo-Xiang as Ah Fei
 Long Hua-Chen as Ah Peng
 Zhao Shuo as girl
 Yuan Qiong-Dan as Xiao Fen
 Liang Zhi-Jian as Pharmacy Owner
 Lin Chao-Rong as Uncle Gu/Tian-Le
 Li Jian-Ren as Cheap guys wife (before)
 Li Yu-Fei as Cheap guys wife (after)
 Xia Wei as Old man killer (Grape Lady)
 Wang Yi-Jin as Prostitute
 Hong Tian-Ming as B.R. Officer
 Lou Nan-Guang as Teacher
 Jiang Hao-Wen as Chef
 Roy Cheung as Police Officer
 Wei Wei as Fire Officer
 Haung Yi-Xin as FEHD Officer
 Lian Jin as Cocky guy
 Chen Shi-Wen as An
 Guo Ying-Dong as Xin
 Jin Xin as Bawd

Plot summary
This movie takes place in an unspecified time period of China, but it is one where the famous heroes of Liangshan Marsh, the 108 Bandits, are currently active. A strange girl named Xu Jin Ling (Betty Sun) possessing a powerful yueqin, which doubles as a weapon for self-defense, offends the prominent businessman, Mr. Zhao (Guo Degang), by humiliating his niece using said musical instrument. As punishment for this act of insolence, Mr. Zhao arranges the marriage between Jin Ling and their home village's ugliest resident, Mao Dai Long (Suet Lam). However, Mr. Zhao's lecherous and conniving cousin, Shi Wen Sheng (Ronald Cheng), takes notice of the beautiful girl, and plots with Mr. Zhao to be rid of Mao Dai Long so that Jin Ling will become Wen Sheng's wife. An unexpected turn of events occur, however, because when Dai Long introduces Jin Ling to his little stepbrother, Mao Song (Cheng Yee Kin), they immediately recognize each other, as they have met each other a long time ago when they were but children. Another series of unexpected events start happening in this seemingly uneventful village, as when Mao Song is helpless to save Dai Long from the crime he was framed by Wen Sheng for and is unable to save Jin Ling from becoming Wen Sheng's wife, he runs into two oddly dressed men, to whom the audience is introduced to as two space aliens named Tranzor and Shakespeare of Planet B16, but introduce themselves to the destitute and somewhat suicidal man as two immortal fairies who will help him address his grievances. For the moment, it seemed as if everything was going the way Mao Song wanted, but things then take a turn for the worse when Jin Ling runs away from home since she refuses adamantly to acknowledge the hideous-looking Dai Long as her husband, though Dai Long didn't really care about that, Mr. Zhao and Wen Sheng hire the 108 Bandits, who are portrayed in this movie not as valiant heroes, but as money-grubbing mercenaries, to kill Jin Ling, and an alien martial artist (Hu Ge) who has been living undercover among humanity for decades and serves a powerful warlord of Planet B16 named the Black Emperor, is finally activated and deployed to assassinate Mao Song, for Mao Song is, in reality, a B16 Alien who's the legitimate heir to the leadership of B16, but was abandoned on Earth by his family under the guise of a human child so that the Black Emperor won't be able to find him.

A great chase occurs with the 108 Bandits being the pursuers and Mao Song and Jin Ling, whose face was horrendously scarred by an acid spray from one of the Bandits, being the quarry. They manage to elude the mercenaries, but Jin Ling attempts to commit suicide by falling off a cliff, as she was unwilling to be married to Mao Song now that her face was rendered hideous, and she was on tenterhooks that Mao Song would have to endure humiliation and being the back end of nasty comments and jokes for marrying such an ugly girl. Mao Song jumped into the dark abyss after her, intending to die alongside her, and it was in this moment that his identity as the leader of Planet B16 had been realized, and when they were seconds away from hitting the bottom, Mao Song sprouted wings of light from his back, flew back up the cliff, and healed Jin Ling's face in the meantime, making her face beautiful again. In this scene, everybody, except for Tranzor and Shakespeare who are drunk at a brothel, shows up; Mr. Zhao and Wen Sheng show up, hidden in the forest behind the cliff's edge, the 108 Bandits stand by the cliff's edge, staring in awe and wonder at the space ship that was rising out of the ground behind Mao Song and Jin Ling, Mao Dai Long appears, following the yueqin that transformed into a hovering robot probe, and the alien assassin, who was disguised as a female school teacher, shows up to kill Mao Song. A duel takes place at the bottom of the cliff, with the alien assassin and Mao Song seeming equally matched, but Mao Song at the last moment turned the tide of the battle in his favor by borrowing the strengths and fighting skills of all the 108 Bandits. After defeating this foe, Mao Song flies back up to the ship where he weds his beloved and offers the 108 Bandits new homes and jobs on Planet B16. Mao Dai Long remains in China with two pretty B16 girls to be his wives after they altered his appearance to make him handsome, and Mr. Zhao and Wen Sheng lament on their mistakes.

At the very end of the movie, the people of the village are seen everywhere lighting incense sticks in honor of a jade Buddha statue they erected some time after witnessing the B16 space ship rising from the ground, which bore a strong resemblance to the Buddha when they saw it from a distance.

Reception
As of 16 February, it had grossed US$4.63 million.

References

2014 comedy films
Chinese comedy films
Films directed by Jeffrey Lau
Films based on Water Margin